Beauregard is a village in Copiah County, Mississippi, United States. The population was 326 at the 2010 census. It is part of the Jackson Metropolitan Statistical Area. Beauregard is named for P. G. T. Beauregard.

Geography
Beauregard is located in southern Copiah County at  (31.721549, -90.388096). It is bordered to the south by the town of Wesson. U.S. Route 51 passes along the western edge of the village, leading north  to Hazlehurst, the county seat, and south  to Brookhaven.

Demographics

As of the census of 2000, there were 265 people, 91 households, and 68 families residing in the village. The population density was 290.5 people per square mile (112.4/km2). There were 94 housing units at an average density of 103.0 per square mile (39.9/km2). The racial makeup of the village was 46.42% White and 53.58% African American.

There were 91 households, out of which 37.4% had children under the age of 18 living with them, 50.5% were married couples living together, 17.6% had a female householder with no husband present, and 24.2% were non-families. 23.1% of all households were made up of individuals, and 4.4% had someone living alone who was 65 years of age or older. The average household size was 2.91 and the average family size was 3.46.

In the village, the population was spread out, with 31.3% under the age of 18, 10.6% from 18 to 24, 28.3% from 25 to 44, 19.6% from 45 to 64, and 10.2% who were 65 years of age or older. The median age was 30 years. For every 100 females, there were 102.3 males. For every 100 females age 18 and over, there were 100.0 males.

The median income for a household in the village was $25,750, and the median income for a family was $34,063. Males had a median income of $32,344 versus $14,063 for females. The per capita income for the village was $11,671. About 15.5% of families and 19.8% of the population were below the poverty line, including 15.1% of those under the age of eighteen and 7.4% of those 65 or over.

Education
Beauregard is served by the Copiah County School District.

Notable person
 Ike Zimmerman, blues guitarist, who is now known to have been musician Robert Johnson's main guitar teacher

References

Villages in Copiah County, Mississippi
Villages in Mississippi
Villages in the Jackson metropolitan area, Mississippi